Sheikh Dahiru Usman OFR (born 29 June 1927) is a Nigerian Islamic Scholar. He is the supreme leader of the Islamic Sufi group known as the Tijaniyyah in Nigeria.

Early life
sheikh Dahiru Bauchi was born in East Gombe at Northern Region, Nigeria. His parents were from Bauchi in East Gombe. His maternal roots are from Gombe. Dahiru Bauchi was born in the Hijri year 1346 (Gregorian calendar: June 29, 1927).

Education 
As a youth Dahiru Bauchi studied the Holy Qur’an under the tutelage of his father Alhaji Usman. Eventually he learned to recite the entire Qur’an from memory as could his father. He studied under scholars like Shaykh Tijani Usman Zangon-Bare-bari, Shaykh Abubakar Atiku and Shaykh Abdulqadir Zaria He received the Tijjaniyyah Tariqah. His father was a Tijani muqaddam (Imam), who was granted authorization (ijāzah) for tariqa. Dahiru Bauchi is deputy chair of the Fatwa Committee of the Supreme Council Of Islamic Affairs (NSCIA) in Nigeria.
He is 95 years old but still healthy as a youth

Criticism 
Sheikh Dahiru Bauchi was detained in 2009 in Saudi Arabia by Saudi security forces while performing his pilgrimage in Mecca. The cause of the arrest was the ongoing doctrinal dispute between three major Nigerian Islamic groups, Darika, Izala, and Shi'ah, that broke out during Ramadan of that year.

Shi'a killings
Usman is not blamed in the 2015 Zaria massacre on Nigerian authorities.

Personal life 
The renowned Islamic scholar, now in his 90's with more than 80 children, married the daughter of the renowned 20th-century Tijani scholar Sheikh Ibrahim Niasse. Sheikh Baba Laminu Niasse of Kaolack, Senegal, officiated the marriage in Ibrahim Niasse Mosque, Senegal.

See also 
 Ibrahim Niass

References

21st-century Muslim scholars of Islam
1927 births
Living people
Nigerian Sunni Muslims